Jay Bulger (born August19, 1982) is an American film director and writer from Washington, D.C.

Biography
Bulger attended Fordham University in the Bronx, where he boxed in several New York Golden Glove tournaments. Photographs of his fighting launched him onto the cover of Vogue and then modelling for brands such as Armani, Calvin Klein, Dolce & Gabbana, Kenneth Cole, and Hermès.

He has directed music videos and commercials for bands such as The Hold Steady, Nightmare of You, Permanent Me, and Playradioplay; and brands such as Pepsi and Disney.

An article entitled "The Devil and Ginger Baker" in Rolling Stone, became the premise for his documentary Beware of Mr. Baker, and in the spring of 2010, Bulger returned to South Africa with a small film crew to finish making the film. Beware of Mr. Baker premiered at the 2012 South by Southwest Film Festival and won the Grand Jury Prize for Best Documentary.

In 2014, Bulger directed the album, The Process with Chad Smith, Bill Laswell, and Jonathan Batiste. For his second feature, Counterpunch, Bulger  set out to capture the state of boxing in the United States. As boxing's popularity declines, three fighters at different stages of their career persevere in order to pursue their dreams of becoming champions. The film earned Bulger and Netflix an Emmy nomination. In his third feature, Their Heads Are Green and Their Hands Are Blue, Bulger retraced Paul Bowles’ 1959 expedition throughout Morocco, in which he set out to record the country’s various tribes and their music. The film is set to be released in fall 2019.

In 2018, Bulger played the lead role of Hunter S. Thompson in the film Freak Power, directed by Bobby Kennedy III.

References

https://www.aspendailynews.com/news/action-battle-for-aspen-finally-in-production/article_29ccd918-b942-11e8-83d6-3366c6fc8c58.html
https://www.vice.com/en_us/article/jm559b/guitar-moves-with-doueh-master-guitarist-of-morocco
https://www.ringtv.com/534801-boxing-documentary-counterpunch-vies-sports-emmy
https://www.musictimes.com/articles/14225/20141103/tale-chad-smith-jon-batiste-john-zorn-dave-lombardo-miles.htm 

1982 births
Living people
American film directors
Fordham University alumni
Film directors from Washington, D.C.